Pinero or Piñero is a surname of the following people
Arthur Wing Pinero (1855–1934), English actor, dramatist and stage director
Begoña García Piñero (born 1976), Spanish basketball player 
Dolores Piñero (1892–1975), Puerto Rican doctor
Esteban Piñero Camacho (born 1981), Spanish singer
Facundo Piñero (born 1988), Argentinian basketball player 
Félix Piñero (born 1945), Venezuelan fencer 
Inmaculada Rodríguez-Piñero (born 1958), Spanish politician 
Jesús T. Piñero (1897–1952), governor of Puerto Rico
Juan Jesús Piñero Bolarín (born 1988), Spanish football forward
Manuel Piñero (born 1952), Spanish golfer 
Marlon Piñero (born 1972), Filipino football player
Miguel Piñero (1946–1988), Puerto Rican playwright and actor
Piñero, a 2001 American drama film about Miguel Piñero
Norberto Piñero (1858–1938), Argentine lawyer, writer and politician 
Sergio Piñero (born 1974), trap shooter from the Dominican Republic
Taqwa Pinero (born 1983), American basketball player